Kevin Hayes may refer to:
Kevin Hayes (cricketer) (born 1962), former English cricketer
Kevin Hayes (hurler) (born 1984), Irish hurler
Kevin Hayes (ice hockey) (born 1992), American ice hockey player
Kevin Hayes (footballer) (1924–2011), Australian rules footballer

See also
Kevin Hays (born 1968), pianist
Kevin Hays (speedsolver) (born 1994), speedsolver